El Diamante High School, known locally as "El D", is a WASC-accredited high school serving students in grades 9–12 in Visalia, California, USA, in Tulare County. It was established as Visalia Unified School District's fourth public high school in 2002. Its current feeder elementary schools are Cottonwood Creek Elementary, Crestwood Elementary, Goshen Elementary, Linwood Elementary, and Veva Blunt Elementary whose students will attend either La Joya Middle School or Ridgeview Middle School prior to their 9th-grade year.

Athletics
El Diamante competes in the California Interscholastic Federation (CIF), Central Section Division II, East Yosemite League.

Fall
 Boys' Cross country
 Girls' Cross country
 Football
 Girls' Golf
 Girls' Tennis
 Girls' Volleyball
 Boys' Water polo
 Girls' Water polo

Winter
 Boys' Basketball
 Girls' Basketball
 Boys' Soccer
 Girls' Soccer
 Wrestling

Spring
 Baseball
 Boys' Golf
 Softball
 Swimming
 Boys' Tennis
 Track and field

Student Activities

Student Newspaper, Television, and Yearbook 

Student newspaper The Dig is published on a monthly basis with a mission "to inspire interest and involvement from the student body within our school, while displaying the achievements, power, knowledge and talents Miners bring to the community."

ED HewS is a student-produced weekly news program. This program airs weekly in student homeroom classes and is archived on the OnAirEdHews YouTube channel.

El Diamante publishes their annual yearbook, The Facet, which is released at the end of the traditional school year.

ASB (Associated Student Body) 
El Diamante's ASB class, which like the other four Visalia high schools' ASB classes, prepare for events during the school year, like Battle for the Saddle against Golden West, and rallies.

References

External links 
 Official Visalia Unified School District website
 El Diamante website

High schools in Tulare County, California
Public high schools in California
Education in Visalia, California
2002 establishments in California